Lars Wichert (born 28 November 1986 in Berlin) is a German rower. At the 2016 Summer Olympics in Rio de Janeiro, he competed in the men's lightweight coxless four. The German team finished in 9th place.

References

External links
 

1986 births
Living people
Rowers from Berlin
Rowers at the 2012 Summer Olympics
Rowers at the 2016 Summer Olympics
Olympic rowers of Germany
World Rowing Championships medalists for Germany
German male rowers
21st-century German people